Ice hockey at the 2019 European Youth Olympic Winter Festival was held from 11 to 14 February at the Zetra Olympic Hall in Sarajevo, Bosnia and Herzegovina. Six countries participated in this event.

Medal summary

Medal table

Medalists

Group stage
All times are local (UTC+1).

Group A

Group B

Final round

Fifth place game

Bronze medal game

Final

References

2019 European Youth Olympic Winter Festival events
European Youth Olympic Winter Festival
International ice hockey competitions hosted by Bosnia and Herzegovina
2019